Double Peak may refer to:

 any mountain with two adjacent summits
 specific mountains with this feature, such as:
 Double Peak (Alaska), a mountain in the Aleutian Range
 Double Peak (Arizona)
 Double Peak (Fresno County, California)
 Double Peak (San Diego County, California)
 Double Peak (Oregon)
 Double Peak (Washington)

See also 
 Twin peak